Germany participated in the Eurovision Song Contest 2017 with the song "Perfect Life" written by Lindsey Ray, Lindy Robbins and Dave Bassett. The song was performed by Levina. The German entry for the 2017 contest in Kyiv, Ukraine was selected through the national final Unser Song 2017, organised by the German broadcaster ARD in collaboration with Norddeutscher Rundfunk (NDR). The national final took place on 9 February 2017 and featured five competing artists and two candidate songs with the winner being selected through four rounds of public voting. "Perfect Life" performed by Levina was selected as the German entry for Kyiv after placing first in the top three during the first round of voting, first in the top two during the second round of voting, both first and second in the top two during the third round of voting and ultimately gaining 69% of the vote in the fourth round.

As a member of the "Big Five", Germany automatically qualified to compete in the final of the Eurovision Song Contest. Performing in position 21, Germany placed twenty-fifth out of the 26 participating countries with 6 points.

Background 

Germany has won the contest on two occasions: in 1982 with the song "Ein bißchen Frieden" performed by Nicole and in 2010 with the song "Satellite" performed by Lena. Germany, to this point, has been noted for having competed in the contest more than any other country; they have competed in every contest since the first edition in 1956 except for the 1996 contest when the nation was eliminated in a pre-contest elimination round. In 2016, the German entry "Ghost" performed by Jamie-Lee placed last out of twenty-six competing songs scoring 11 points.

The German national broadcaster, ARD, broadcasts the event within Germany and delegates the selection of the nation's entry to the regional broadcaster Norddeutscher Rundfunk (NDR). NDR confirmed that Germany would participate in the 2017 Eurovision Song Contest on 23 May 2016. Since 2013, NDR had set up national finals with several artists to choose both the song and performer to compete at Eurovision for Germany. On 14 September 2016, the broadcaster announced that they would organise a multi-artist national final to select the German entry in the format of a talent show similar to 2010 and 2012, which resulted in a first place and a top ten result respectively at Eurovision for Germany.

Before Eurovision

Unser Song 2017 
Unser Song 2017 (English: Our Song 2017) was the competition that selected Germany's entry for the Eurovision Song Contest 2017. The competition took place on 9 February 2017 at the Köln-Mülheim Studios in Cologne, hosted by Barbara Schöneberger. Like in the previous seven years, the national final was co-produced by the production company Brainpool, which also co-produced the 2011 Eurovision Song Contest in Düsseldorf and the 2012 Eurovision Song Contest in Baku. Five artists and two candidate songs competed during the show with the winner being selected through a public televote. The show was broadcast on Das Erste, One and Deutsche Welle as well as online via the broadcaster's Eurovision Song Contest website eurovision.de. The national final was watched by 3.14 million viewers in Germany.

Format 
The winner was selected through four rounds of public voting, including options for landline, SMS and app voting. For the first time, international viewers were also able to vote via the app entitled Eurovision Vibes with the results made known during the show, however the results had no direct influence on the results. In the first round, the five finalists performed a cover of a song of their choice and the top three artists were selected to proceed to the second round. In the second round, the top three artists performed their versions of "Wildfire", the first of the two songs bidding for Eurovision, and the top two artists were selected to proceed to the third round. In the second round, the top two artists performed their versions of "Perfect Life", the second of the two songs bidding for Eurovision, and the top two combinations of artist and song were selected to proceed to the final round. This could result in either one song per artist, or one artist with both songs. Three music experts provided feedback in regards to the performances during the show. The music experts were: Lena (singer-songwriter, winner of the Eurovision Song Contest 2010 for Germany), Tim Bendzko (singer-songwriter) and Florian Silbereisen (singer and television presenter).

Competing entries 
Interested solo artists were able to apply for the competition by submitting an online application along with a performance clip of either a cover song or a self-created song via YouTube between 14 September and 18 November 2016, or by presenting themselves and performing in front of a live camera at casting shows that were held at the Köln-Mülheim Studios in Cologne on 5 November 2016 and at the Hamburg-Lokstedt Studios in Hamburg on 12 November 2016. By the end of the process, it was announced that 2,493 applications were received by NDR and 33 artists were shortlisted by an expert panel consisting of NDR, ARD, Raab TV representatives and musical director Wolfgang Dalheimer. Nathan Trent was automatically eliminated from the shortlist after he was announced as the 2017 Austrian Eurovision entrant on 19 December 2016. The five participating acts were selected during a final casting round and were announced on 6 January 2017. On 17 January 2017, it was announced that Sadi had withdrawn from the competition and was replaced by Yosefin Buohler. On 1 February 2017, NDR announced the two selected candidate songs to be performed by the five finalists during the competition.

Final 
The televised final took place on 9 February 2017. The top two entries were: "Wildfire" and "Perfect Life" performed by Levina. In the fourth round, the winner, "Perfect Life" performed by Levina, was selected. In addition to the performances of the competing entries, former winners of the Eurovision Song Contest Nicole (1982), Ruslana (2004) and Conchita Wurst (2014) performed a medley of Eurovision winning songs, while German singers Matthias Schweighöfer and Tim Bendzko performed their respective new songs "Supermann und seine Frau" and "Immer noch Mensch".

Controversy 
Several news sites and blogs had discussed a possible plagiarism of "Perfect Life" from the songs "Titanium" by David Guetta and "Young and Wild", a song composed by Aleksandra Kovač for the 2014 German film of the same name. "Perfect Life" was written by Lindsey Ray, Lindy Robbins and Dave Bassett, and it had been claimed that their composition predates the film, and hence could not have plagiarised the soundtrack to "Young and Wild".

At Eurovision 
The Eurovision Song Contest 2017 took place at the International Exhibition Centre in Kyiv, Ukraine and consisted of two semi-finals on 9 and 11 May and the final on 13 May 2017. According to Eurovision rules, all nations with the exceptions of the host country and the "Big Five" (France, Germany, Italy, Spain and the United Kingdom) are required to qualify from one of two semi-finals in order to compete for the final; the top ten countries from each semi-final progress to the final. As a member of the "Big Five", Germany automatically qualified to compete in the final. In addition to their participation in the final, Germany is also required to broadcast and vote in the second semi-final. The European Broadcasting Union (EBU) split up the competing countries into six different pots based on voting patterns from previous contests, with countries with favourable voting histories put into the same pot. Germany placed 25th with 6 points in the final.

Voting

Points awarded to Germany

Points awarded by Germany

Detailed voting results
The following members comprised the German jury:
 Nicole Seibert (Nicole; jury chairperson)singer, winner of the Eurovision Song Contest 1982
 Joy Denalanesinger
 Adel Tawilsinger
 Wincent Weisssinger-songwriter
  (Boogieman)music producer

References

External links
 Official ARD Eurovision site
 Official Unser Song 2017 site

2017
Countries in the Eurovision Song Contest 2017
Eurovision
Eurovision